Regina Weber (born 12 April 1963) is a German former individual rhythmic gymnast. She is the 1984 Olympic All-around bronze medalist.

Personal life 
She married the Senegalese footballer Souleyman Sané. They have 3 sons: Kim Sané, Leroy Sané and Sidi Sané.

Career 
Weber competed in her first Worlds at the 1981 World Championships finishing in 10th place in the all-around. She got her highest placement finishing 8th in all-around at the 1983 World Championships.

When rhythmic gymnastics was officially added as an Olympic Sport in 1984, athletes from USSR and Bulgaria were considered as favorites, but the Eastern led Boycott of the 1984 Summer Olympics meant the top competitors were absent. Weber then went to win the bronze medal at the 1984 Summer Olympics behind Romanian silver medalist Doina Stăiculescu. Between 1981 and 1986 she won nearly all national titles in various rhythmic gymnastics events in Western Germany.

Weber returned to international competition for the 1987 World Championships where she finished 12th in the all-around. She announced her retirement that same year at the end of the season.

References

External links
 
 
 

1963 births
Living people
German rhythmic gymnasts
Gymnasts at the 1984 Summer Olympics
Olympic bronze medalists for West Germany
Olympic gymnasts of West Germany
Olympic medalists in gymnastics
Medalists at the 1984 Summer Olympics